The third competition weekend of the 2008–09 ISU Speed Skating World Cup was held at the Krylatskoye ice rink in Moscow, Russia, from Saturday, 22 November, until Sunday, 23 November 2008.

Schedule of events
The schedule of the event is below.

Medal summary

Men's events

Women's events

References

3
Isu World Cup, 2008-09, 3
Sports competitions in Moscow